Michael George Browning (born May 26, 1964) is an American heavy metal drummer and vocalist.

Life and career 
Browning started to play drums at 13 years old. His main influences are Black Sabbath, Slayer, Angel Witch, Mercyful Fate, and Celtic Frost.

Browning was the former drummer/vocalist for death metal pioneers Morbid Angel. He played in the band from 1984 to 1986 and made one official recording with them, Abominations of Desolation; it was not released until 1991, years after Browning left the band. Browning had a very turbulent relationship with Morbid Angel guitarist Trey Azagthoth; Browning's exit from the band was apparently triggered by Azagthoth being involved in an affair with Browning's then-girlfriend, leading to an altercation between the two.

Following his departure from Morbid Angel, Browning remained active as the drummer/vocalist for bands in the Florida death metal scene, including Nocturnus, a technical/progressive-oriented death metal band featuring a keyboard player and science fiction-themed lyrics. Browning was the drummer and vocalist for the band on their album The Key (1990) and solely played drums on Thresholds before being fired from the band in 1993. The band has now been revived under the name "Nocturnus AD", but it's not a reunion because Nocturnus AD contains different members from the original Nocturnus, except Browning. Other projects he participated in during the 1980s and 1990s included Florida death metal bands Incubus and Acheron.

Browning's current band is called After Death, with lyrics concerned with the occult and black magic. He was also involved in Devine Essence and Wolf and Hawk, with metal singer Lisa Lombardo. He is currently residing in Tampa, Florida and has a collection of medieval weapons and Ancient Egyptian artifacts in his home. He is also interested in  muscle cars and 3D graphic design.

In 2008, he released a solo album called "Mike Browning's Inner Workings – Trancemissions" at Pharmafabrik Recordings.
He also has a band called Nocturnus AD and their debut album Paradox was released on May 24, 2019, on Profound Records.

He has a daughter that was born in 2007.

References

External links
 Interview with Browning about all of his projects
 Official website of After Death

Living people
American heavy metal drummers
Morbid Angel members
1964 births
20th-century American drummers
American male drummers
20th-century American male musicians
 American heavy metal singers